Yves Vandewalle (born 5 June 1950 in Freiburg im Breisgau) is a member of the National Assembly of France.  He represents the Yvelines department, and is a member of the Union for a Popular Movement.

References

1950 births
Living people
Politicians from Freiburg im Breisgau
Union for a Popular Movement politicians
Deputies of the 13th National Assembly of the French Fifth Republic